George Irby Redditt (September 2, 1863 - October 1, 1953) was a Democratic member of the Mississippi House of Representatives, representing Carroll County, from 1916 to 1920.

Biography 
George Irby Redditt was born on September 2, 1863, in Teoc, Carroll County, Mississippi. His parents were David Lorenzo Redditt and Mary Elizabeth (Sledge) Redditt. He received his M. D. degree from Tulane University in 1889. He married Maybell Alice Hill in 1893. After retiring from practicing medicine after 12 years of doing so, he was elected Vice President of the People's Bank of North Carrollton, Mississippi. In 1915, he was elected to represent his native Carroll County in the Mississippi House of Representatives. He served from 1916 to 1920. He continued practicing medicine afterwards, retiring after 60 years of doing so in 1949. He died in Morgan City, Mississippi, on October 1, 1953.

References 

1863 births
1953 deaths
People from Carroll County, Mississippi
Democratic Party members of the Mississippi House of Representatives
Tulane University School of Medicine alumni